Matrand is a village in Eidskog Municipality in Innlandet county, Norway. The village is located along the Norwegian National Road 2 and the Kongsvingerbanen railway line.

Battle of Matrand

Matrand was host to the bloodiest battle of the entire Swedish-Norwegian War of 1814. This was where Lieutenant Colonel Andreas Samuel Krebs (1766-1818), who was leading the Norwegian forces, attacked the temporary stronghold set up by the Swedish forces led by Major General Carl Pontus Gahn (1759–1825).

Eidskog Museum 
The Eidskog Museum is located at Matrand. It was officially opened on 7 June 1985 as the first museum facility in Eidskog. This building had been a primary school for Matrand from 1879 until 1971. There are permanent exhibitions of school material, as well as banner exhibitions.

Eidskog Church

Eidskog Church is located at Matrand. It was built of wood in 1665. The architect and builder was Knut Mortensen. The church has a baroque altarpiece from 1667. The brass baptismal font was given as a gift to the church in 1682. An Olsen & Jørgensen organ from 1898 was restored in 1974. The church is part of the Diocese of Hamar and can seat 350 people.

References

External links
Eidskog  Museum website
Eidskog Church website

Eidskog
Villages in Innlandet